Roseomonas mucosa is a species of Gram negative, strictly aerobic, coccobacilli-shaped, pink-pigmented bacterium. It was first isolated from blood in 2000. The new species name was first proposed in 2003 and derives from Latin mucosa (mucous, slimy), referring to the muccoid, almost runny bacterial colonies. During a survey of 36 strains of Roseomonas, R. mucosa was the most common species isolated.

A small study of 10 adults and 5 children showed R. mucosa might be able to be used as a treatment for eczema.

References

External links
Type strain of Roseomonas mucosa at BacDive -  the Bacterial Diversity Metadatabase

Rhodospirillales
Bacteria described in 2003